Cho Jeong-sik (from Seoul, December 25, 1963) is a South Korean politician and chief policymaker of the Democratic Party of Korea. He is a member of the National Assembly of the Republic of Korea.

Career

Before entering politics 
He was born in Seoul in 1963. He graduated from Dongsung High School in Seoul and Yonsei University with a degree in architecture. In fact, he was not an ardent activist in college. He joined an activist-related society, which ended at the level of just joining and reading books, and in 1985, he was the leader of the rally, but he was forced to avoid things like arrest and imprisonment when he joined the army after the rally. So, I was able to graduate without any experience in school, which is usually a resume of athletic students. In particular, the easy graduation was earnestly requested by Cho Jung-sik's father.

However, after graduating from college, I started doing activities that I didn't do when I was a student. After graduating from college, he hid his identity and got a job as a pressman and started working in the labor movement. Jo Jung-sik, who had been working in the labor field for four years, entered politics in earnest in 1990 when the merger of the three parties was announced, joining the so-called Little Democratic Party, the remaining opposition forces, and taking the position of a professional committee member.

Entering politics 
Jejeong-gu, who was respected socially as a godfather of the poor movement while advocating clean politics in the 14th general elections, was elected by running for the Siheung-Gunpo region on the Democratic Party's ticket. And Cho Jung-sik began his full-fledged political career, serving as an aide to lawmakers in Jejeong-gu. Per minute and the Democratic Party political journey for together with the jejeonggu and 1995 by the dj United Democratic Party, and not to go to the National Council, saejeongchiResidual, and when United Democratic Party is divided into two groups in the 1997 presidential election process again also moved to the Grand National Party along the jejeonggu

After Jejeong-gu's death in 1999, he also served as an aide to Lee Bu-young, who moved from the United Democratic Party to the Grand National Party. And in the 16th presidential election in 2002, he served as a special aide to Lee Hoi-chang. However, he left the GNP in 2003 following Lee Bu-young and joined the Uri Party, completely settling down with the current DP party.

five-term lawmaker 
He was elected as a candidate for the 17th National Assembly in 2004 by running for the Uri Party in the Eul district of Siheung, Gyeonggi Province, followed by the United Democratic Party in the 18th National Assembly election in 2008, the Democratic United Party in the 19th National Assembly election in 2012, the Democratic Party of Korea in the 20th National Assembly election in 2016, and the same constituency in 2020.

After being elected for the first time, he served as vice chairman of the Uri Party's education and training committee and as a member and spokesman of the Uri Party's first-term group of lawmakers. Although it was initially classified as a pro-Roh faction, it is often classified as a faction of Sohn Hak-kyu, as he showed a favorable attitude toward Sohn in the process of disbanding the Uri Party. When he was a second-term lawmaker, he served as floor spokesman, vice floor leader and chairman of the Gyeonggi Provincial Party. He served as secretary-general of the main opposition New Politics Alliance for Democracy from August 2014 to February 2015, when he served as a three-term lawmaker.

Negotiation and coordination have been recognized, but there is an assessment that something on its own is a bit disappointing. However, in the case of lawmakers who have a lot of players, but are not very noticeable, the majority of lawmakers are faithful to the management of their constituencies, which is why they are supported by residents. It can be seen from the fact that about 50 out of 300 lawmakers are on the big news. He, however, may also be conscious, but he is said to be aiming for the post of chairman of the standing committee in the 20th National And he became the chairman of the Land, Infrastructure and Transport Committee in the first half of the 20th National Assembly, as he had hoped. A series of favorable reviews have been made that his undergraduate major is architecture and the Land, Infrastructure and Transport Committee, which serves as the chairman of the standing committee, is closely related to his major, making a good choice. It's the prime standing committee that everyone is looking for. This is because if the SOC (Social Overhead Capital) is elected and belongs to the Land, Infrastructure and Transport Committee, it will be easier to implement its pledges through budget allocation using its standing member status, which will be advantageous for the next election. In addition, the so-called chairman, secretary or standing committee chairman can exert influence with a simple instruction.

On November 15, 2017, the Framework Act on Sustainable Infrastructure Management was proposed as a representative, and the above bill was revised and implemented on January 1, 2020.

On January 21, 2019, he was appointed chief policymaker of the main opposition Minjoo Party of Korea.

On July 11, regarding Japan's economic retaliation, he responded to remarks made at a forum of the Korea Economic Research Institute under the Federation of Korean Industries that "the cause of political and diplomatic failures" and "the show-off response," calling them "ridiculous remarks" and "regretful for disparaging the government's efforts and passing the buck to the Korean government at a Korean government."

In the 21st general elections, he was registered as a preliminary candidate, and won the fifth term with 69,720 votes and 67.0 percent of the votes. It is the highest number of votes among the elected candidates in the Seoul metropolitan area.

In the 21st National Assembly, he is said to be interested in floor leader rather than vice speaker of the National Assembly.

Police records 

 Violation of Road Traffic Act (Denial of Drinking): 1.5 million won fine (July 5, 2000)

Electoral history

References

1963 births
Living people
People from Seoul
South Korean politicians